Sahaja means spontaneous enlightenment in Indian and Tibetan Buddhist spirituality. Sahaja practices first arose in Bengal during the 8th century among yogis called Sahajiya siddhas.

Ananda Coomaraswamy describes its significance as "the last achievement of all thought", and "a recognition of the identity of spirit and matter, subject and object", continuing "There is then no sacred or profane, spiritual or sensual, but everything that lives is pure and void."

Etymology 
The Sanskrit [and the Tibetan, which precisely follows it] literally means: 'born or produced together or at the same time as. Congenital, innate, hereditary, original, natural (...by birth, by nature, naturally...)'.

Etymologically,  means 'together with', and  derives from the root , meaning 'to be born, produced, to occur, to happen'. The Tibetan  is an exact etymological equivalent of the Sanskrit.  means 'together with', and  means 'to be born, to arise, to come about, to be produced'. The Tibetan can function as a verbal phrase, noun, or adjective.

Origins and Buddhist Sahajayana 

The siddha Saraha (8th century CE) was the founder of the Hindu movement, with crossover with some Vajrayana Buddhist elements, termed Sahajayana, which flourished in Bengal and Odisha. Sahajiya mahasiddhas like Saraha, Kanha, Savari and Luipa were tantric Hindus and Buddhists who expounded their beliefs in songs and dohas in the Apabhraṃśa languages  and Bengali. Many of the songs in this tradition are preserved in the Charyapada.

Sahajiyas such as Saraha believed that enlightenment could be achieved in this lifetime, by laypersons living in samsara. The sahajiyas practiced a form of ritual union which was supposed to bring the female and male elements together in balance.

Saraha and his disciples were also master practitioners of Mahamudra meditation, and Saraha composed a famous Mahamudra meditation text along with his 'Three Cycles of Doha', a series of yogic songs. Sahajiyas also criticized the Hindu caste system. Sahajayana Buddhism became very popular in the Pala Empire, especially among commoners.

One of the classic texts associated with the Sahajiya Buddhists is the Hevajra Tantra. The tantra describes four kinds of Joy (ecstasy):

From Joy there is some bliss, from Perfect Joy yet more. From the Joy of Cessation comes a passionless state. The Joy of Sahaja is finality. The first comes by desire for contact, the second by desire for bliss, the third from the passing of passion, and by this means the fourth [Sahaja] is realized. Perfect Joy is samsara [mystic union]. The Joy of Cessation is nirvana. Then there is a plain Joy between the two. Sahaja is free of them all. For there is neither desire nor absence of desire, nor a middle to be obtained.

In the Nāth tradition 

 is one of the four keywords of the Nath sampradaya along with Svecchachara, Sama, and Samarasa.  meditation and worship was prevalent in Tantric traditions common to Hinduism and Buddhism in Bengal as early as the 8th–9th centuries. The British Nath teacher Mahendranath wrote:

The concept of a spontaneous spirituality entered Hinduism with Nath yogis such as Gorakshanath and was often alluded to indirectly and symbolically in the twilight language common to  traditions as found in the Charyapada and works by Matsyendranath and Daripada. It influenced the bhakti movement through the Sant tradition, exemplified by the Bauls of Bengal, NamdevDnyaneshwar, Meera, Kabir and Guru Nanak, the founder of Sikhism.

Yoga in particular had a quickening influence on the various  traditions. The culture of the body through processes of Haṭha-yoga was of paramount importance in the Nāth sect and found in all  schools. Whether conceived of as 'supreme bliss', as by the Buddhist Sahajiyās, or as 'supreme love' (as with the Vaiṣṇava Sahajiyās), strength of the body was deemed necessary to stand such a supreme realisation.

Vaishnava-Sahajiya 

The  sect became popular in 17th century Bengal. It sought religious experience through the five senses. The divine relationship between Krishna and Radha (guises of the divine masculine and divine feminine) had been celebrated by Chandidas (born 1408 CE), Jayadeva  (circa 1200 CE) and Vidyapati (c 1352 - c 1448) whose works foreshadowed the rasas or "flavours" of love. The element of love, the innovation of the  school, is essentially based on the element of yoga in the form of physical and psychological discipline.

 is a synthesis and complex of traditions that, due to its tantric practices, was perceived with disdain by other religious communities and much of the time was forced to operate in secrecy. Its literature employed an encrypted and enigmatic style. Because of the necessity of privacy and secrecy, little is definitively known about their prevalence or practices.

The  or the siddhi or 'natural accomplishment' or the 'accomplishment of the unconditioned natural state' was also a textual work, the  revealed by Dombi Heruka (Skt. Ḍombi Heruka or Ḍombipa) one of the eighty-four Mahasiddhas. Moreover, it must be remembered that though Sundararajan and Mukerji (2003: p. 502) use a masculine pronominal the term  is not gender-specific and that there were females, many as senior , amongst the  communities:

Ramana Maharshi

 is temporary,  whereas  is a continuous state throughout daily activity. It also seems to be a more advanced state, since it comes after the mastering of samadhi.

See also 
 Wu wei
 Samadhi
 Turiya
 Sambalpur
 Balasore
 Ziran
 Mahamudra
 Shikantaza
 Ten bulls
 Five ranks

Notes

References

Sources

Printed sources

 Arora, R.K. The Sacred Scripture (New Delhi: Harman, 1988), chapter 6: Sahaja
 Das Gupta, Shashibhusan. Obscure religious cults (Calcutta: Mukhopadhyay, 1969)
 Davidson, Ronald M. "Reframing Sahaja: genre, representation, ritual and lineage", Journal of Indian Philosophy, vol.30, 2002, pp45–83
 Dimock, Edward C. Jr. "The Place of the Hidden Moon - Erotic Mysticism in the Vaiṣṇava-sahajiyā Cult of Bengal, University of Chicago Press, 1966
 
 Kvaerne, Per. "On the Concept of Sahaja in Indian Buddhist Tantric Literature", Temenos, vol.11, 1975, pp88-135
 Mahendranath, Shri Gurudev. Ecstasy, Equipoise, and Eternity. Retrieved Oct. 20, 2004.
 Mahendranath, Shri Gurudev. The Pathless Path to Immortality. Retrieved Oct. 20, 2004.
 Neki, J.S. "Sahaja: an Indian ideal of mental health", Psychiatry, vol.38, 1975, pp1–10
 Ray, Niharranjan. "The Concept of Sahaj in Guru Nanak's Theology and its Antecedents", in Medieval Bhakti Movements in India, edited by N.N.Bhattacharyya (New Delhi: Munshiram Manoharlal, 1969), pp17–35

Web-sources

 Timothy Conway (2012), Saraha: One of the earliest, wisest Buddhist Tantra mahasiddha-sages

Bengali philosophy
Buddhism in Bangladesh
Schools of Buddhism
Buddhist philosophical concepts
Hindu philosophical concepts
Bhakti movement
Nondualism
Advaita
Yoga